Mikhaylovskaya is a rural locality (a village) in Denisovskoye Rural Settlement, Gorokhovetsky District, Vladimir Oblast, Russia. The population was 11 as of 2010.

Geography 
The village is located 7 km south from Proletarsky, 32 km south-west from Gorokhovets.

References 

Rural localities in Gorokhovetsky District